The West Bridge is a growing architectural approach, originally developed by Cypress Semiconductor, which enhances and modularizes a peripheral controller in an embedded computer architecture. Conceptually, the West Bridge parallels and complements the decentralization represented by the North Bridge and the South Bridge. Most notably, it has been used by Research in Motion to permit extremely high data transfer rates in its BlackBerry devices.

Overview
While the North Bridge focuses on memory control and the South Bridge focuses on "slower" capabilities of the motherboard, the West Bridge focuses on peripheral control. The new architectural modularization opens the potential for increased system performance. Being directly connected, peripheral control can be handled wholly and independently through a West Bridge's controller, leaving a processor offloaded and free to focus on other data intensive operations. Not only in increasing performance of the system via the processor, a West Bridge companion chip may itself serve directly as a peripheral accelerator.

Etymology
The term West Bridge was first introduced by Cypress Semiconductor, which designs products to provide optimal performance and connectivity in the embedded world. The name was chosen deliberately to be a meme consistent with the North Bridge and South Bridge concepts. "West Bridge" refers both to the architectural scheme in general and to the product family with which it was introduced, by Cypress.

Interface Support 

Interfaces change all the time towards faster, lower power, fewer pins, and newer standards, making it a difficult task for processors to follow and integrate them. A prime function of West Bridge devices is to enable connection to these varied interfaces.

An example of such an interface is NAND Flash, which keeps evolving with new generations of Multi-Level Cell NAND. A West Bridge device might handle the MLC NAND management and enable lowest-cost memory support for a main processor, which otherwise would only support NOR or Single-Level Cell NAND.

Some commonly supported interfaces of West Bridge companion chips are:
 Mass storage
 GPIO
 MMC+
 SD v1.1
 SD v2.0
 SDIO
 CE-ATA
 MLC NAND
 SLC NAND
 Full NAND Management
 Processor
 SRAM
 SPI
 ADMUX
 NAND
 NOR
 USB
 USB 2.0 at 480 Mbit/s

Applications 
The West Bridge architecture is relevant to a broad range of applications.

Common applications include:
 Handsets
 Portable Media Players
 Personal Digital Assistants
 Portable Navigation Devices
 Digital Cameras
 Printers
 Point-of-sale terminals
 Set-Top Boxes
 Security Dongles

References

External links 
 Embedded.com - West Bridge-arrive at improved high-speed USB in multimedia handset design
 EdaGeek.com - Cypress West Bridge Antioch Controller Ranks First in Benchmarks

Motherboard
Computer peripherals
Embedded systems